Rodez–Aveyron Airport  is a growing airport, located on the territory of the commune of Salles-la-Source approximately 10 km outside the centre of Rodez, the departmental capital of Aveyron, France.
It has one international runway of 2,100m in length, as well as a second, small runway of 800m in length.
It is an ideal airport for reaching the departments of Aveyron, Tarn, Tarn-et-Garonne, Lot, Hérault, Gard, Lozère, and Cantal.

It is the 25th French-Metropolitan airport.

History
In 1971, the Rodez–Aveyron Airport was founded and managed by SAEML Air 12 which comprised the CCI of Rodez, Aveyron General Council, and the main regional banks. In March 2002, the Paris Orly connection by Air France commenced and was operated by Brit Air (a regional airline operating scheduled services as an Air France franchise). In 2003, there was an extension of the runway to 2,100 m and the installation of a new Instrument Landing System (ILS). In January 2008, there was an extension of the parking to 1000 places. In 2009, there was an extension of the airport and the creation of a new departure lounge.

Airlines and destinations
The following airlines operate regular scheduled and charter flights at Rodez–Aveyron Airport:

Statistics

References

External links
Official website
Aéroport de Rodez–Marcillac (Union of the French Airports).

Airports in Occitania (administrative region)
Airports established in 1971
Buildings and structures in Aveyron